Karlovy Vary District is a district in the Karlovy Vary Region of the Czech Republic. Its capital is the city of Karlovy Vary.

Administrative division
Karlovy Vary District is divided into two administrative districts of municipalities with extended competence: Karlovy Vary and Ostrov.

List of municipalities
Towns are marked in bold:

Abertamy - 
Andělská Hora - 
Bečov nad Teplou - 
Bochov - 
Boží Dar - 
Božičany - 
Bražec -
Březová - 
Černava - 
Chodov - 
Chyše - 
Čichalov - 
Dalovice - 
Děpoltovice - 
Doupovské Hradiště –
Hájek - 
Horní Blatná - 
Hory - 
Hroznětín - 
Jáchymov - 
Jenišov - 
Karlovy Vary - 
Kolová - 
Krásné Údolí - 
Krásný Les - 
Kyselka - 
Merklín - 
Mírová - 
Nejdek - 
Nová Role - 
Nové Hamry - 
Ostrov - 
Otovice - 
Otročín - 
Pernink - 
Pila - 
Potůčky - 
Pšov - 
Sadov - 
Šemnice - 
Smolné Pece -
Stanovice - 
Štědrá - 
Stráž nad Ohří - 
Stružná - 
Teplá -
Teplička - 
Toužim - 
Útvina - 
Valeč - 
Velichov - 
Verušičky - 
Vojkovice - 
Vrbice - 
Vysoká Pec - 
Žlutice

Part of the district area belongs to Hradiště Military Training Area.

Geography

Karlovy Vary District borders Germany in the north. The character of the terrain is very diverse, the landscape alternates between mountainous, hilly and slightly undulating. The territory extends into six geomorphological mesoregions: Ore Mountains (north), Doupov Mountains (east), Sokolov Basin (west), Slavkov Forest (west), Teplá Highlands (south) and Rakovník Uplands (small part in the southeast).

The most important river is the Ohře, which flows across the territory from west to northeast. Its longest tributaries within the district are the rivers Teplá and Rolava. The southern part of the district is drained by the Střela, a tributary of the Berounka. The district is also crossed by the Černá in the north. There are no significant bodies of water. The largest body of water is the Žlutice Reservoir.

There is one protected landscape area, located in the west of the district: Slavkovský les.

Demographics

Most populated municipalities

Economy
The largest employers with its headquarters in Karlovy Vary District and at least 500 employers are:

Transport
The I/6 road, which is the unfinished section of the D6 motorway from Prague to Karlovy Vary and Cheb (part of the European route E48), passes through the district. The I/20 road (part of the European route E49) leads from Karlovy Vary to Plzeň.

Karlovy Vary Airport is located in the district. It is one of the six public international airports in the country.

Sights

The Red Tower of Death in Ostrov, the mining cultural landscape Jáchymov and the mining cultural landscape Abertamy – Boží Dar – Horní Blatná were designated UNESCO World Heritage Sites in 2019 as parts of the transnational Ore Mountain Mining Region.

The historic city centre of Karlovy Vary with the spa cultural landscape was designated a UNESCO World Heritage Site in 2021 as part of the transnational Great Spa Towns of Europe because of its springs and architectural testimony to the popularity of spa towns in Europe during the 18th through 20th centuries.

The most important monuments in the district, protected as national cultural monuments, are:
Bečov nad Teplou Castle
Reliquary of St. Maurus
Red Tower of Death in Ostrov
Císařské lázně spa building in Karlovy Vary
Church of Saint Mary Magdalene in Karlovy Vary
Mint in Jáchymov
Mauritius Mine in Abertamy
Blatenský water ditch

The best-preserved settlements and landscapes, protected as monument reservations and monument zones, are:

Karlovy Vary (monument reservation)
Archaeological site in Karlovy Vary-Tašovice (monument reservation)
Bečov nad Teplou
Horní Blatná
Jáchymov
Ostrov
Toužim
Valeč
Žlutice
Kojšovice
Kosmová
Abertamy – Boží Dar – Horní Blatná – Mining Landscape
Jáchymov Mining Landscape
Bečovsko landscape
Valečsko landscape

The most visited tourist destinations are the Motýlí dům tropical garden in Karlovy Vary, Bečov nad Teplou castle and chateau, Klínovec observation tower, Becherovka visitor's centre in Karlovy Vary, and botanical garden in Bečov nad Teplou.

References

External links

Karlovy Vary District profile on the Czech Statistical Office's website

 
Districts of the Czech Republic